Arvika Basket is a Swedish basketball club from Arvika founded in 1976. It is best known for its women's team, which won six national championships in a row between 1989 and 1994 and reached the final of the 1991 European Cup, lost to Athena Cesena. It currently plays in the second tier.

Titles
 Damligan
 1989, 1990, 1991, 1992, 1993, 1994

References

Women's basketball teams in Sweden
Sport in Värmland County
EuroLeague Women clubs
Basketball teams established in 1976
1976 establishments in Sweden